Lancy-Pont-Rouge railway station is a railway station in the municipality of Lancy, in the Swiss canton of Geneva. It is an intermediate stop on the standard gauge CEVA orbital railway line of Swiss Federal Railways. The current station opened in 2017, replacing a temporary station that opened in 2002.

Services 
 the following services stop at Lancy-Pont-Rouge:

References

External links 
 
 

Railway stations in the canton of Geneva
Swiss Federal Railways stations
Railway stations in Switzerland opened in 2002